Visiting expeditions to the International Space Station are teams of one to three astronauts who visit the ISS by Soyuz on short duration expeditions. EP-N is a term used by RKK Energia, meaning both "Visiting Crew" as "Visiting Expedition".

Humans have been on the ISS on a temporary basis since December 1998 and on a permanent basis since November 2000. The permanent occupation of the station is carried out by core crews, who usually stay for six months. Along with this, space shuttles have also been to the ISS during the construction of the station.

Three-seat, single-use Soyuz serve as lifeboats on the ISS, changing every six months. If transporting the core members does not fully occupy the Soyuz, the ships end up being crewed by astronauts returning after a week or ten days on the space shuttle (usually representatives of space agencies other than Russia or space tourists) or by the Soyuz. These crew members are the "visiting team" and their expeditions are called "visiting expeditions" (Russian: экспедиция посещения, or ЭП). In the period 2000–2002, when crews were switched to the space shuttle, visiting expeditions ended up being three people. From 2003 to 2009, there was only one seat available on the Soyuz in addition to two main crew seats. Since 2009, the main crews have been six crew members and the Soyuz was solely used for its transportation until the Crew Dragon launch. The next short visit did not occur until September 2015, in connection with the one-year mission to the ISS, and then in 2019.

Continued international collaboration on ISS missions has been thrown into doubt by the 2022 Russian invasion of Ukraine and related sanctions on Russia.

List
Dates beside "Expedition X" are from the stay at the Station.

Cancelled
Expeditions canceled due to the Space Shuttle Columbia disaster.

See also
Space tourism
Spaceflight participant
List of human spaceflights
List of ESA space expeditions
List of International Space Station expeditions

Notes

References

Expeditions to the International Space Station
ISS